Alexandru Mihailescu (born 16 August 1982) is a Romanian athlete specialising in the 110 metres hurdles. He represented his country at two World Indoor Championships, in 2006 and 2008, reaching the semifinals on the second occasion.

He has personal bests of 13.55 seconds in the 110 metres hurdles (+1.3 m/s, Haniá 2006) and 7.68 seconds in the 60 metres hurdles (Bucharest 2005).

Competition record

References

1982 births
Living people
Romanian male hurdlers